J.J. Weaver (born November 30, 1999) is an American college football outside linebacker for the Kentucky Wildcats.

Early life and high school career
Weaver grew up in Fort Lauderdale, Florida before moving to Louisville, Kentucky before starting high school. He attended Moore Traditional School. As a senior, he had 70 tackles with 10 sacks and three interceptions. Weaver committed to play college football at Kentucky over offers from Louisville, Miami, and Purdue.

College career
Weaver played in three games during his true freshman season and maintained a redshirt. He had 33 tackles with 6.5 tackles for loss during his redshirt freshman year. Weaver tore his ACL in Kentucky's game against Florida and missed the rest of the season. He returned the next season and had 33 tackles with 10.5 tackles for loss and led the Wildcats with 6.5 sacks.

Personal life
Weaver was born with six fingers on his right hand.

References

External links
Kentucky Wildcats bio

Living people
Players of American football from Louisville, Kentucky
American football linebackers
Kentucky Wildcats football players
Players of American football from Fort Lauderdale, Florida
1999 births